Khopat (Devnagari:खोपट) is an area located in the city of Thane, Maharashtra, India.

References 

Neighbourhoods in Thane